Gülsim İlhan Ali (born 18 February 1995) is a Turkish television actress and model. She is best known for her roles as Aslıhan Hatun in the historical drama series Diriliş: Ertuğrul and Gülcemal in Payitaht: Abdülhamid. She also appeared as İlkgün in Hanım Köylü.

Life and career
Gülsim Ali, was born on 18 February 1995 in Bulgaria as Gülsim İlhan Ali. Her parents are the one of Turkish minority in Bulgaria. Ali is fluent in Turkish, Bulgarian, English and Japanese. In 2009, she won the contest named 'Super Model Ford Models Bulgaria', in the same year she delineated Bulgaria in 'Ford Models of the World' beauty contest in Brazil.

She started her acting in 2012 by starring in the series Balkanlar 1912. She was one of the leading actresses in the series Hanım Köylü, in which she depicted the character of İlkgün, along with the actor Yusuf Çim. Ali played the role of Aslıhan Hatun, the youngest daughter of Candar Bey, in the 2014 Turkish historical series Diriliş: Ertuğrul. In 2019, she depicted the character of Ayşegül in the series Yüzleşme. In the same year, she was cast in the historical drama series Payitaht: Abdülhamid as Gülcemal. In 2020, she had a leading role in the series Gönül Dağı and depicted the character of Dilek.

Filmography

References

External links

People from Ruse, Bulgaria
Turkish television actresses
Turkish female models
1995 births
Living people